Arcot (natively spelt as Ārkāḍu) is a town and urban area of Ranipet district in the state of Tamil Nadu, India. Located on the southern banks of Palar River, the city straddles a trade route between Chennai and Bangalore or Salem, between the Mysore Ghat and the Javadi Hills  (Javvadhu malai). , the city had a population 129,640. The sweet makkan peda is a local speciality while Arcot biryani, a rice-based traditional food, is also served here.

Etymology
Arcot is the anglicized form of the Tamil word ārkāḍ, which is commonly believed to have been derived from the Tamil words aaru (River) + kaadu (forest). However, arkaadu meant 'a forest of fig trees'.

Jainism was flourishing in this part of Tamil Land who were otherwise known as Arugar most probably corrupted form of Arhants or the perfected souls. The word Arugar is found in many ancient literary works and places dominant with Arugars were related to them viz Arakonam, Arumbakkam, Aruvur, etc.  Not far away from present day Arcot, there is a place called Arungundram. Hence Aarkaadu would have derived its name from Arugarkaadu.

History

Carnatic

The town's strategic location has led to it being repeatedly contested and prompted the construction of a formidable fortress. The Nawabdom of the Carnatic was established by the Mughal Emperor Aurangzeb, who in 1692 appointed Zulfiqar Ali Khan as the first Nawab of the Carnatic. In 1740, the Maratha forces came down upon Arcot. They attacked the Nawab, Dost Ali in the pass of Damalcherry. In the war that followed, Dost Ali, one of his sons Hasan Ali, and a number of prominent persons lost their lives. This initial success at once enhanced Maratha prestige in the south. From Damalcherry the Marathas proceeded to Arcot. It surrendered to them without much resistance. Chanda Saheb and his son were arrested and sent to Nagpur. In 1751, The English captured the town during the conflict between the United Kingdom and France for control of South India. The English successfully held it with only 500 men against the French and the Nawab, resisting for 56 days (23 September to 14 November 1751). The enemy army eventually dissolved and its leader, Chanda Shahib, was killed. Mohammed Ali Khan Walajah took over as Nawab who allied with the British. His successors soon ran up enormous debts at the hands of English speculators. In 1801, the town was annexed by the British East India Company.

In the 20th century, Arcot declined in importance and was incorporated into Vellore District. Arcot has the tomb of the famous 18th-century Sufi Saint  Tipu Mastan Aulia. The story goes that from the blessings of Tipu Mastan Aulia, Hyder Ali had a son Tippu Sultan of Mysore, whom he appropriately named after the saint.

In Kaspa, Sri Vaikuntha Varadharaja Perumal Temple is situated. The speciality of this temple is that it is the only temple where the Lord Vishnu statue  is erected in the middle with Sri Devi and Bamadevi at its sides. This type of posture of Lord Perumal is only present in this temple. Moreover, the three statues are designed using a single stone. This temple was built during the Pallava era.

Geography
It has an average elevation of 164 metres (538 ft).

Government
Arcot Municipality was constituted in 1959. It  had Third Grade Municipality and was subsequently upgraded to second Grade Municipality in 1973. In July 1998, it was  upgraded to I Grade Municipality. The selected council with 30 members and chairpersons have functioned from 25 October 2006.

The first grade commissioner is working as Executive Authority of the Municipal Administration with the Regional Director of Municipal Administration, Vellore and Collector of Vellore District and overall control by the Commissioner of Municipal Administration are functioning  administrative head of this urban local body.

Arcot Town has a 13.64 km2 area with a population of 129,640 as per the recent census. The Municipal office is situated nearly  1/4 km east from the bus stand.

Arcot town is an historical town with monuments and forts once ruled by Arcot Navab. The town is located on the southern bank of Palar river, easily accessible from the capital of Tamil Nadu. Chennai is within  120 km and the district headquarters are within  25 km.

Arcot has been developing as a commercial centre for long time as it is connected to Chennai and Vellore by the National Highways-46 Ranipet to Krishnagiri Road (Arani to Chennai) passing through this town. Arcot is famous for the coarse rice variety called "arcot kicheli", and thus several rice mills and paddy mundys were established. Besides this, tourists see nick beauty namely Delhi Gate and green stone mosque within the town. This generates floating population to this town.

Arcot (State Assembly Constituency) is part of Arakkonam (Lok Sabha constituency).

Economy
Arcot is the principal market for the surrounding agricultural area. It also has a viable local weaving industry, and  groundnut oil industry. Arcot is most famous for edible oil production, mainly focusing on groundnut and gingelly oil production.
A number of oil expellers are available in and around Arcot. Certain caste of people are more dominant and involved in this edible oil business.

Culture
The people who lived in the Arcot region, especially in and near the temple town of Tiruvannamalai, belonged to a clan called the Arcots. The Nawabs fought with and ruled over them for a long period. With the establishment of the Danish Missionary Society, many of these Arcots converted Christians. The Danish Missionary Society (DMS, currently Dan Mission) established many schools and hospitals. The first missionary of the DMS was the German Rev. C.C.E. Ochs. He started his first mission station, Bethanien, at Melpattambakkam in South Arcot in 1861. Now all its activities have been transferred to the nearby town of Nellikuppam.

The second mission station of DMS was opened at Tirukkoyilur in 1869 by Rev. P. Andersen and was called "Siloam". Siloam church was consecrated on 10 October 1886 and on the same day the first Indian pastors were ordained and more than 30 persons were baptized.  A week later a church was consecrated in an outstation, Sengalmedu. The beautiful church in Pop ham's Broadway in Madras was built in 1892.

Saron, a third mission station of DMS, was opened in 1882 and situated just outside the town Tiruvannamalai. In 1898 a mission station was built in the town.  From 1905 it was called "Carmel." The fourth mission station in the Arcot District, "Bethesda," in Kallakurichi was built in 1893 by Rev. A. Larsen. Later DMS started mission stations at Panruti, Vriddhachalam, Devanampatnam, Darisanapuram, and Servaroj Hills, etc. In 1913 a church constitution was inaugurated. This church is serving the Tamil-speaking population in the districts of South and North Arcot, Tamil Nadu. Mayana Kollai is celebrated here. People paint themselves and appear as gods having goat flesh in their mouths and drumsticks in their hands. They walk over the bazaar street towards the burial ground.

Eassayanoor  Valavanoor. Ramzan and Bakrid festivals celebrate in grand manner.

Currently traditional and farmers' festival is Pongal, Tamil New Year And Diwali.

Demographics

According to 2011 census, Arcot had a population of 129,640 including Tajpura and Veppur revenue villages under the municipality control with a sex-ratio of 1,014 females for every 1,000 males, much above the national average of 929. A total of 7,174 were under the age of six, constituting 3,249 males and 3,925 females. Scheduled Castes and Scheduled Tribes accounted for 10.31% and .15% of the population respectively 75% of the population in this town belongs to Backward peoples. The average literacy of the town was 79.32%, compared to the national average of 72.99%. The town had a total of  16781 households. There were a total of 20,418 workers, comprising 48 cultivators, 166 main agricultural labourers, 1,273 in house hold industries, 17,782 other workers, 1,149 marginal workers, 12 marginal cultivators, 25 marginal agricultural labourers, 142 marginal workers in household industries and 970 other marginal workers. As per the religious census of 2011, Arcot had 70.5% Hindus, 25% Muslims, 0.77% Christians, 0.01% Sikhs, 0.% Buddhists, 0.51% Jains, 0.16% following other religions and 0.01% following no religion or did not indicate any religious preference.

Transport
The main mode of transport is by bus since it is economical, and well connected by road. A national highway and two state highways pass through Arcot. There are frequent buses to almost all parts of Tamil Nadu. Buses depart every 15 minutes from Arcot to Chennai and there are also buses to Hosur, Bangalore, Tirupathi, Arani, Tiruvannamalai and Pondicherry (Puducherry). There are lot of private bus operators as well, who provide services on local and short-distance routes. The nearest railway station to Arcot is Walaja Road, which is around 7 km from Arcot. There are buses (Route 202) between Arani and Chennai very frequently and also a straight bus (Route 123) between Arcot and Chennai. The local bus from Arcot to Vellore is route no.7.

The nearest railway station is walajah Road station 6 km from the town, lying between Arakkonam and Vellore-Katpadi Junction 30 km. The new broad gauge line from Tindivanam to Nagari via Walajah Road Junction will pass through Arcot. It will function within one year.

The city has an airstrip near Abdullapuram;  it was not open to the public and was used for aeronautical training programmes. The nearest international airports are Chennai International Airport (100 km) and Bengaluru International Airport (258 km); the nearest domestic airport is Tirupati Airport (90 km).

Urban Area

Vellore Metropolitan Area

Places of interest
 Palar Dam
 Delhi gate 
 Green Mosque
 Raja Rani Pond
 Panja pandavar hill

References

External links

 Vellore portal
 "Arcot." Encyclopædia Britannica (2005)
 "Arcot." The Columbia Encyclopedia (2004)
 "Arcot (S. India)". The Companion to British History, Routledge (2001)
 "Arcot". The Hobson Jobson Dictionary (1902)

Cities and towns in Vellore district